The 2008 CONCACAF Futsal Championship was the fourth edition of the main international futsal tournament of the North and Central America and the Caribbean region. It took place in Guatemala City, Guatemala from 3 to 8 June 2008, with the Domo Polideportivo de la CDAG as the only venue.

Hosts Guatemala won the tournament after defeating the United States in semifinals and Cuba in the final. It was the first international futsal title won by Guatemala.

The tournament also acted as a qualifying tournament for the 2008 FIFA Futsal World Cup in Brazil, with second and third placed teams Cuba and the U.S. joining Guatemala as the qualified teams.

Qualifying 
Qualifying to 2008 CONCACAF Futsal Championship took place in Macoya, Trinidad and Tobago from 3–6 April 2008. and all matches played in Canedo Hall in the Centre of Excellence, Port of Spain.

Group A

Group B

Third & Fourth Places

Final

Final standing 
  *
  *
 
 
 
 

* Qualified to 2008 CONCACAF Futsal Championship

Championship 
The eight participating teams are divided into two groups of four which will play each on a single round-robin format. The top two teams of each group advance to semi-finals. The top three teams for the tournament will earn participation at the 2008 Futsal World Cup.

Group A

Group B

Knockout stage

Semifinal

3rd place

Final

Winner

Final standing

References

External links 

CONCACAF Futsal Championship
International futsal competitions hosted by Guatemala
CON
Concacaf Futsal Championship, 2008
Fut